A sloth is a mammal of the rainforests in the Americas.

Sloth or Sloths may also refer to:
Sloth (deadly sin), laziness, one of the seven deadly sins

Animals
Ground sloth, an extinct primate of the Americas
Sloth bear, a bear of India
Sloth lemur, an extinct lemur

Arts
Sid the Sloth, a character in the Ice Age film franchise
Sloth, a deformed man in The Goonies, a 1985 American adventure comedy film
Sloth, a 2006 graphic novel by Gilbert Hernandez
Sloth (Fullmetal Alchemist), a manga and anime character
 "Sloths!", a SNL Digital Short from the American late-night live television variety show

Music
"Sloth", a song by Fairport Convention from the 1970 album Full House
"The Sloth", a song by Phish from the 1987 album The Man Who Stepped into Yesterday
"Sloth", a song by Saint Vitus from the 1995 album Die Healing

People
Casper Sloth (born 1992), Danish footballer
Charlie Sloth (born 1987), British hip hop artist, actor, TV presenter and DJ
Jørn Sloth (born 1944), Danish chess player and former world champion of correspondence chess